Kiyoshi Miyazato (born 28 February 1977) is a Japanese professional golfer.

Miyazato plays on the Japan Golf Tour, where he has won once.

His sister, Ai Miyazato, and brother Yūsaku Miyazato are also professional golfers.

Professional wins (2)

Japan Golf Tour wins (1)

1Co-sanctioned by the Asian Tour

Japan Golf Tour playoff record (0–1)

Japan Challenge Tour wins (1)

External links

Japanese male golfers
Japan Golf Tour golfers
Sportspeople from Okinawa Prefecture
1977 births
Living people